The 1977-78 season of the Tongan A Grade was the sixth recorded season of top flight association football competition in Tonga. Veitongo FC
won the championship, their first title. The season began on the December 17, 1977.

Teams 
 Funga'onetaka
 Kolofoʻou
 Ma'ufanga
 Ngeleʻia FC
 Toafaka'amu
 Veitongo I
 Veitongo II

References

Tonga Major League seasons
Tonga
Football
Football